Capitólio is a Brazilian municipality located in the southwest of the state of Minas Gerais. Its population  was 8,663 people living in a total area of 522 km2. The city belongs to the meso-region of Sul e Sudoeste de Minas and to the micro-region of Passos.  

The slogan for the city is "Queen of the Lakes", in reference to its proximity to the Furnas reservoir.  With the flooding of the lake part of the old town of Capitólio was submerged.  When the water goes down more than 10 meters the old church of the ruins of the town of Guapé can be seen.

History
In 1939, the district of Capitólio was elevated to the category of village and named as Vila de Capitólio. It became a municipality in 1948.

Location
The city center of Capitólio is located at an elevation of 766 meters east of Passos and bordering on the northern edge of the Furnas reservoir.   Neighboring  municipalities are:  Vargem Bonita (NW),  Piumhi (N), Pimenta (E), Guapé (SE and S), São José da Barra (SW), and São João Batista do Glória (W).

Distances
Belo Horizonte: 270 km on MG-050
Piumhi: 17 km to the northeast
Passos: 76 km (10 km north to junction with MG-50, then west on MG-050 for 66 km)
Uberaba 290 km
Ribeirão Preto: 225 km
Formiga: 82 km
Other neighboring municipalities: Pimenta 43 km, Divinópolis 160 km, Alpinópolis 71 km, Lavras 208 km, Guapé 30 km, Ibiraci 140 km, Cássia 120 km, Itaú de Minas 90 km, Pratápolis 106 km, and Delfinópolis 150 km.

Economic activities
The economy is based on services and agriculture, especially cattle raising for dairy production.  The region is famous for a type of stone called "pedra mineira", and there are quarries for its mining.  Tourism, due to the Furnas reservoir, has been growing in recent years.  The GDP in 2005 was approximately R$58 million, with 30 million reais from services, 6 million reais from industry, and 17 million reais from agriculture.  There were 475 rural producers on 22,000 hectares of land.  69 farms had tractors (2006).  Approximately 1300 persons were occupied in agriculture.  The main crops are coffee, soybeans, and corn.  There were 18,000 head of cattle, of which 3,000 were milk cows (2006).

There was one bank (2007).  In the vehicle fleet there were 1,797 automobiles, 122 trucks, 246 pickup trucks, 13 buses, and 741 motorcycles (2007).

Health and education
In the health sector there were 7 health establishments: 6 public clinics and 1 private hospital with 27 beds (2005).  Patients with more serious health conditions are transported to Passos.  Educational needs of 1,650 students were met by 7 primary schools, 1 middle school, and 4 pre-primary schools.

Municipal Human Development Index: 0.785 (2000)
State ranking: 96 out of 853 municipalities 
National ranking: 941 out of 5,138 municipalities 
Literacy rate: 89%
Life expectancy: 74 (average of males and females)

In 2000 the per capita monthly income of R$252.00 was below the state average of R$276.00 and below the national average of R$297.00.  Poços de Caldas had the highest per capita monthly income in 2000 with R$435.00.  The lowest was Setubinha with R$73.00.

The highest ranking municipality in Minas Gerais in 2000 was Poços de Caldas with 0.841, while the lowest was Setubinha with 0.568.  Nationally the highest was São Caetano do Sul in São Paulo with 0.919, while the lowest was Setubinha.  In more recent statistics (considering 5,507 municipalities) Manari in the state of Pernambuco has the lowest rating in the country—0,467—putting it in last place.

Tourism
Tourism is very important and there are several hotels in the city.  The most important are the Balneário do Lago Hotel, Cyrilos Palace Hotel, Hotel Capitólio, Hotel Escarpas do Lago, Hotel Fazenda Engenho da Serra, Hotel Minastur, and Lara's Hotel.

Places to visit
Furnas Lake:  Created by the Furnas dam, the reservoir has an area of 1,440 km2.   It is known as the "Sea of Minas".
Praia Artificial de Capitólio:  The artificial beach lies in the city limits and has an area of 24,895.12 square meters.  It is on the Rio Piumhi and was inaugurated in 1988.  It has public bathrooms, a covered area for festivals, two sports courts, a covered court and an area for walking.  It is here where the carnival celebrations take place.
Cachoeira Lagoa Azul: It is located 31 km from the urban area.  There is clear water with natural pools.
Morro do Chapéu: This is a mountain with an elevation of 1,293 meters.  On the top one can find a plateau with tropical vegetation and springs of water that form waterfalls as they descend the slopes.  There are still animals such as wolves, armadillos and tamanduás.  From the heights one can see the immense lake below and the cities of Capitólio, Guapé, Alpinópolis and Nova Barra.
Canyons: in Furnas Lake there are rock formations with a height of more than 20 meters.

See also
 List of municipalities in Minas Gerais
 Capitólio rockfall

References

External links

Prefeitura municipal de Capitólio

Municipalities in Minas Gerais